1974 in Korea may refer to:
1974 in North Korea
1974 in South Korea